The 1918 Marquette Hilltoppers football team was an American football team that represented Marquette University as an independent during the 1918 college football season. In its second season under head coach John J. Ryan, the team compiled a 2–0–1 record.

Schedule

References

Marquette
Marquette Golden Avalanche football seasons
College football undefeated seasons
Marquette Hilltoppers football